Memphis Street Academy Charter School at J.P. Jones is a charter school located in the Port Richmond neighborhood of Philadelphia, Pennsylvania. It is located in the former John Paul Jones Junior High School building. It was designed by Irwin T. Catharine and built in 1923–1924. It is a three-story, 17-bay, brick building on a raised basement in the Colonial Revival style. It features a central projecting entrance pavilion of stone, brick pilasters, and stone cornice and brick parapet. It was named for Naval hero John Paul Jones (1747–1792).

The building was added to the National Register of Historic Places in 1988.

References

External links

School buildings on the National Register of Historic Places in Philadelphia
Colonial Revival architecture in Pennsylvania
School buildings completed in 1924
Port Richmond, Philadelphia
Charter schools in Pennsylvania